Michael Mullins (born 22 February 1953) is an Irish Fine Gael politician. He was elected to Seanad Éireann on the Cultural and Educational Panel in April 2011. He was a member of Galway County Council from 1985 to 2011 representing Ballinasloe. He was an unsuccessful candidate for the Galway East at the 1992 general election. He is the Fine Gael Seanad spokesperson on Foreign Affairs and Trade. He is a former human resources manager. He is a first cousin of independent Senator Rónán Mullen.

References

1953 births
Living people
Fine Gael senators
Local councillors in County Galway
Members of the 24th Seanad
People from Ballinasloe
Politicians from County Galway